Giannis Kalaitzis (November 11, 1945 – February 12, 2016) was a Greek cartoonist known for his editorial cartoons in various Greek daily newspapers.

Early life
Kalaitzis was born and grew up in the suburb of Kokkinia in Athens, where his family owned a coffee shop. He was a member of Lambrakis Democratic Youth.

Career
Kalaitzis was active for several decades and his works have been published in newspapers such as Avgi, Eleftherotypia, Efimerida ton Syntakton, and magazines such as Vavel, Anti, DIO, and Galera.

He also did the scenic and costume design for the 1977 film  Happy Day directed by Pantelis Voulgaris.

References

Greek cartoonists
Greek caricaturists
Members of the Lambrakis Democratic Youth
1945 births
2016 deaths
Artists from Piraeus